"Abbas and Gulgaz" is an Azerbaijani love dastan based on the poems of the ashig Abbas Tufarganly. Presumably, the dastan was composed in the 17th century. It tells about the love of the ashig Abbas for a girl named Gulgaz.

In dastan, Gulgaz is forcibly taken to the Shah's palace. Abbas, bypassing various obstacles, is reunited with his beloved. Dastan tells about the campaign of the Shah Abbas I on the territory of Azerbaijan, who takes Gulgaz with him. The dastan also tells about the sufferings of the ashig Abbas, separated from his beloved.

In the dastan "Abbas and Gulgaz" there are tense waiting scenes and epic images full of lyricism. The dastan "Abbas and Gulgaz" is a classic example of a medieval Azerbaijani love dastan. The dastan is performed by ashigs. There are several versions of the dastan.

References

Azerbaijani-language literature
Azerbaijani folklore
Azerbaijani literature
Turkic epic poems